Lysvik is a locality situated in Sunne Municipality, Värmland County, Sweden with 341 inhabitants in 2010.

References 

Populated places in Värmland County
Populated places in Sunne Municipality